is a town located in Oshima Subprefecture, Hokkaido, Japan.

As of 30 October 2016, the town has an estimated population of 5,694. The total land area is 310.75 km2.

Geography
Oshamambe faces Uchiura Bay, which is a bay of the Pacific Ocean.

Neighboring municipalities
 Oshima Subprefecture
 Yakumo
 Hiyama Subprefecture
 Imakane
 Shiribeshi Subprefecture
 Kuromatsunai
 Shimamaki
 Iburi Subprefecture
 Toyoura

Climate

History
1864: The village of Oshamambe was founded.
1906: Oshamambe became a Second Class Village.
1923: Oshamambe became a First Class Village.
1943: Oshamambe village became Oshamambe town.

Education

University
 Tokyo University of Science, Oshamambe Campus

High school
 Hokkaido Oshamambe High School

Junior high school
 Oshamambe Junior High School

Elementary schools
 Oshamambe Elementary School
 Shizukari Elementary School

Transportation
Setana Line ran from Kunnui Station. There used to be Asahihama station between Oshamambe Station and Shizukari Station.
 Hakodate Main Line: Kita-Toyotsu - Kunnui - Nakanosawa - Oshamambe - Futamata - Warabitai
 Muroran Main Line: Oshamambe - Shizukari
 Hokkaido Expressway: Shizukari PA - Oshamambe IC - Kunnui IC
 Route 5
Plans are in place to build a station at Oshamambe and construction is underway on the Hokkaido Shinkansen line. The section between Hakodate and Sapporo should be completed by 2030.

References

External links

Official Website 

Towns in Hokkaido